The Wellness and Events Center (WEC) is 220,000 sq ft. sports and recreation facility that includes a 3,500 seat basketball arena in Newark, New Jersey. It was built at a cost of $102 million by the New Jersey Institute of Technology. The Wellness and Events Center is the home court of the NJIT Highlanders who joined the NCAA Division I American East Conference on July 1, 2020. The WEC replaced the former arena of the Highlanders, the Fleisher Center. The new arena broke ground on November 12, 2015, and opened in time for the 2017–18 basketball season.

See also
 List of NCAA Division I basketball arenas
 Sports in Newark, New Jersey

References

External links
 NJIT Wellness and Events Center

College basketball venues in the United States
NJIT Highlanders basketball
Sports venues in Newark, New Jersey
Indoor arenas in New Jersey
2017 establishments in New Jersey
Sports venues completed in 2017
Basketball venues in New Jersey